Pure Dixieland is a mostly instrumental album of traditional New Orleans classics, from an ensemble of New Orleans jazz masters, including a young Harry Connick Jr at the age of eleven.

The album was originally released in 1979, titled Pure Dixieland. It was re-released in November 1992 as Eleven.

Track listing
"Sweet Georgia Brown" (Maceo Pinkard, Kenneth Casey, Ben Bernie) – 4:39
"Tin Roof Blues" (Walter Melrose, Leon Rappolo, Paul Mares, Ben Pollack, George Brunies, Mel Stitzel) – 2:55
"Wolverine Blues" (Jelly Roll Morton, Benjamin Spikes, John Spikes) – 3:06
"Jazz Me Blues" (Tom Delaney) – 3:04
"Doctor Jazz" (Joe "King" Oliver, Melrose) – 3:27
"Muskrat Ramble" (Ray Gilbert, Kid Ory) – 2:39
"Lazy River" (Hoagy Carmichael, Sidney Arodin) – 2:48
"Joe Avery's Piece" (Traditional) – 3:11
"Way Down Yonder in New Orleans" (Joe Turner Layton, Henry Creamer) – 2:46

Musicians
Harry Connick Jr. – piano, vocals on "Doctor Jazz"
Jim Duggan – trombone
Liston Johnson – clarinet
Freddie Kohlman – drums
Walter Payton – bass
Tedd Riley – trumpet

References

External links
Eleven, at harryconnickjr.com

1979 albums
1992 albums
Harry Connick Jr. albums